William Cameron may refer to:

 William Cameron (Australian politician) (1877–1931), New South Wales politician
 William Cameron (explorer) (1833–1886), British surveyor who discovered the Cameron Highlands
 William Cameron (Canadian politician) (1847–1920), Nova Scotian politician
 William Bleasdell Cameron (1862–1951), survivor of the Frog Lake Massacre, journalist and author
 William E. Cameron (1842–1927), American politician
 William Gordon Cameron (1827–1913), British soldier and colonial administrator
 William Cameron (priest) (1688–1765), Irish Anglican priest
 William George Cameron (1853–1930), Canadian politician in the Legislative Assembly of British Columbia
 William John Cameron (1907–1990),  Scottish minister
 William J. Cameron (1878–1955), Canadian newspaper editor
 Willie Cameron (1883–1958), Scottish football player and manager (Blackburn Rovers, Hull City, Bury)
 Bill Cameron (footballer) (1928–2021), Australian rules footballer for St Kilda
 Bill Cameron (journalist) (1943–2005), Canadian journalist
 Bill Cameron (mystery author) (born 1963), American author
 Bill Cameron (philanthropist) (1924–1993), Canadian inventor, engineer and founder of the Neil Squire Society
 Billy Cameron (1896–1972), Canadian ice hockey player

See also
 William Cameron Coup (1837–1895), American businessman
 William Cameron Edwards (1844–1921), Canadian businessman and politician
 William Cameron Forbes (1870–1959), American investment banker and diplomat
 William Cameron McCool (1961–2003), American naval commander and astronaut
 William Bruce Cameron (born 1960), American author, columnist, and humorist